Murray Shire was a local government area in the Riverina region of south western New South Wales, Australia.  It included the towns of Moama and Mathoura. It was abolished on 12 May 2016 and its area merged with the Wakool Shire to establish the Murray River Council.

The last mayor of Murray Shire was Cr. Thomas Weyrich, an independent politician.

History
The Murray Shire region was developed in the 1840s by squatters following the route of the overlanders as they drove cattle from Sydney to Adelaide in the late 1830s. From the 1860s onwards, the selectors, mainly from Victoria, moved onto the squatter's land, their interest agriculture.  The settlements of Moama and Mathoura survived over the years as centres for the movement of agriculture produce and the growth of the timber industry. The area covered by the Shire of Murray today is unique. The Cadell Fault, which changed the course of the Murray River about 30,000 years ago traverses the area from north to south. The Murray River system supports one of the largest River Red Gum forests in the world.

On 12 May 2016 the Minister for Local Government announced the dissolution of the Murray and Wakool shires and the formation of the Murray River Council with immediate effect.

Council

Composition and election method
Prior to its dissolution, the Murray Shire Council was composed of nine councillors elected proportionally as a single ward. All councillors were elected for a fixed four-year term of office. The mayor was elected by the councillors at the first meeting of the council. The most recent and last election was held on 8 September 2012 and the makeup of the former council was as follows:

The former council, elected in 2012 and dissolved in 2016, in order of election, was:

References

Former local government areas of New South Wales
2016 disestablishments in Australia